Taylah O'Neill (born 11 November 1994) is an Australian freestyle skier. She was born in Darlinghurst. She  competed at the 2014 Winter Olympics in Sochi in women's moguls.

References

External links

 

1994 births
Living people
People from New South Wales
Freestyle skiers at the 2014 Winter Olympics
Freestyle skiers at the 2022 Winter Olympics
Australian female freestyle skiers
Olympic freestyle skiers of Australia